Davydas Arlauskis (born 18 November 1986 in Telšiai, USSR) is a Lithuanian footballer, who plays as defender. He is currently free agent.

His brother Giedrius Arlauskis is also a footballer.

References

External links
Profile & Statistics at LFF.lt 

1986 births
Living people
Lithuanian footballers
Lithuania international footballers
Expatriate footballers in Romania
Lithuanian expatriate sportspeople in Romania
Liga I players
FC Šiauliai players
FC Džiugas players
Association football defenders
I Lyga players
Lithuanian expatriate sportspeople in Norway
Expatriate footballers in Norway